The National Assembly is the unicameral legislature of Senegal. The Assembly was previously part of a bicameral legislature from 1999 to 2001 and from 2007 to 2012, with the indirectly elected Senate being the upper house. The Senate was abolished for a second time in September 2012.

The current National Assembly 
The current National Assembly, formed following elections in July 2017, comprises 165 elected members who serve five-year terms.  The electoral system is a mixed member majoritarian (MMM) system; 90 deputies are elected in 35 single and multi-member districts (departments) by simple majority (plurality) party block vote (PBV, winning party list takes all seats in the district) and 60 seats are filled proportionally based on the national distribution of votes. There are also 15 seats for overseas voters. Voters have a single ballot and vote for the party list.  This single ballot is applied to both the majoritarian and proportional vote counts.

Historical National Assembly election results

Notes
The Senegalese Progressive Union (UPS) was the Socialist Party's predecessor.
Senegal was a one-party state from 1966 to 1974. Only the Socialist Party fielded candidates in the 1968 and 1973 elections.
Let Us Unite Senegal (JLS) was a coalition of three political parties - the National Democratic Rally (RND), And Jëf-African Party for Democracy and Socialism (AJ-PADS), and Convention for Democrats and Patriots-Garab Gi (CDP-Garab Gi).

List of National Assembly Presidents

See also
History of Senegal
Legislative branch
Senate (Senegal)
List of presidents of the National Assembly of Senegal

References

Further reading

External links
 

Government of Senegal
Senegal
Organizations established in 1960
1960 establishments in Senegal